Röyksopp's Night Out is an extended play (EP) by Norwegian electronic music duo Röyksopp. It contains live recordings from the duo's concert at Rockefeller Music Hall in Oslo, Norway, in November 2005.

Background
The EP was released domestically on 27 January 2006. Röyksopp has stated that the EP was originally meant for the Japanese fans, the most enthusiastic Röyksopp fans, according to the band members. All of the vocalists who contributed on Röyksopp's second studio album, The Understanding (2005), except Karin Dreijer (who was replaced by Norwegian singer Anneli Drecker) were present at the concert. The EP also includes a remixed cover version of the Queens of the Stone Age song "Go with the Flow".

The EP was named after a song from their debut album, Melody A.M. (2001), though the song was not performed.

Track listing

Personnel
Credits adapted from the liner notes of Röyksopp's Night Out.

Röyksopp
 Röyksopp – arrangements, production ; vocals 
 Svein Berge – vocals 

Additional personnel

 Ronald Hernes – recording
 Tim Summerhayes – mixing
 Dave O'Carrol – mastering
 Kate Havnevik – creative input, vocals 
 Kristian Stockhaus – guitar 
 Ole Vegard Skauge – bass guitar 
 Anneli Drecker – vocals 
 Chelonis R. Jones – vocals 
 Stian Andersen – photos
 Jean-Louis Duralek – artwork

Charts

References

2006 debut EPs
2006 live albums
Live EPs
Röyksopp albums
Wall of Sound (record label) albums